Minuscule 204 (in the Gregory-Aland numbering), δ 357 (Soden), is a Greek minuscule manuscript of the New Testament, on parchment. Paleographically it has been assigned to the 13th century.

Description 

The codex contains the text of the New Testament (except Book of Revelation) on 443 parchment leaves (size ). The order of books: Gospels, Acts of the Apostles, Catholic epistles, Pauline epistles. The text is written in one column per page, in 25 lines per page.

It has no the Epistula ad Carpianum. There are no a division according to the Ammonian Sections.

It contains Prolegomena, Eusebian Canon tables, synaxaria, numbered  (lessons), lectionary equipment at the margin, Menologion, subscriptions at the end of each book, numbers of stichoi, pictures, and the Euthalian Apparatus.

Text 

The Greek text of the codex is a representative of the Byzantine text-type. Hermann von Soden classified it to the textual family Kx. Aland placed it in Category V. According to the Claremont Profile Method it belongs to the textual family Kr in Luke 1 and Luke 20. In Luke 10 no profile was made. It belongs to the subgroup 35.

History 

Formerly the manuscript belonged to the monastery S. Salvator in Bologna.

It was examined by Birch, Scholz, Dean Burgon, and Oscar von Gebhardt. C. R. Gregory saw it in 1886.

Since 1867 it is housed at the Bologna University (2775), at Bologna.

See also 

 List of New Testament minuscules
 Biblical manuscript
 Textual criticism

References

Further reading 

 

Greek New Testament minuscules
13th-century biblical manuscripts